Ayan Pal is an Indian author and public speaker who is best known for his novel Confessions on an Island, as well as his acclaimed short stories in the anthologies Chronicles of Urban Nomads and 21 Tales to Tell. He has also co-authored India's first composite novel, Crossed and Knotted, which made it into the Limca Book of Records.

Early life and education

Pal was born in Calcutta (now Kolkata) and raised in a Hindu matriarchal joint family along with his parents, grandmother and aunts.

After being schooled at St. Joseph's College, Calcutta he went onto obtain a bachelor's degree in Electronics & Communication Engineering from Dr. Ambedkar Institute of Technology, Bangalore. He has also done a course in Education Technology from San Diego State University, California.

Public Speaker

In 2013 Pal received its highest award, Distinguished Toastmaster (DTM), for achieving both the Advanced Communication Gold and Advanced Leader Silver awards.

In 2017 Pal was adjudged as the national champion for impromptu speaking (Table Topics) for District 41 (serving North and East India).

Author

Pal's work as an author and writer formally began in 2014 when he was published in 21 Tales to Tell, as a result of being adjudged as one of the 21 best writers across India in a contest organized by Notion Press that saw over 4 lakh readers choose among 562 competing authors. He followed this up with critically acclaimed short stories in Chronicles of Urban Nomads and Her Story

In 2015 he featured in India's first composite novel Crossed and Knotted, which made it into the Limca Book of Records., and later in Rudraksha.

In 2016 Pal made his debut as a solo novelist with Confessions on an island and also contributed to When they Spoke. Later that year, he was a finalist in the Orange Flower Awards for Digital Creative Superstars (awarded by Women's Web in association with HarperCollins) for 2016 in the categories of Creative Writing and Humor.

In 2017 he participated in Saptan Stories, an initiative by British Council India and the Oscar winning Aardman Animations that was developed as a part of the UK-India Year of Culture 2017. Heralded as the first-ever purely crowd-sourced short story art project in India, the contest saw seven artists from India and UK illustrate the 6 winning entries, of which Pal had his story-line voted as the best entry twice during the 7 week long contest. The same year, he was included by Writer's Social Networking Platform – Kalaage in the list of India's Top 100 New and Rising Authors.

In 2018, Pal was listed by the Hindustan Times as one of the "Five Indian short story writers to read" for those who like stories that are told in fewer words.

He also contributes to the South Asian literary magazine Open Road Review and literary social forum Readomania

Books
Pal's novels include:
 Crossed and Knotted (Kurious Kind Media, 2015)
 Confessions on an Island (Kurious Kind Media, 2016)

Pal's anthologies (co-authored) include:
 21 Tales to Tell (Notion Press, 2014)
 Upper Cut (Red Ink Publishers, 2014)
 Her Story (Petals Publishers, 2014)
 Chronicles of Urban Nomads (Kurious Kind Media, 2014) 
 Rudraksha (Kurious Kind Media, 2015)
 Long Story Short (Notion Press, 2015)
 When They Spoke (Kurious Kind Media, 2016)
 Tonight's The Night (Notion Press, 2016)
 Arranged to Love (Notion Press, 2016)

References 

1980 births
Living people
21st-century Indian novelists
English-language writers from India
Writers from Kolkata
21st-century Indian short story writers